The Arms Control and Disarmament Act of 1961, 22 U.S.C. § 2551, was created to establish a governing body for the control and reduction of apocalyptic armaments with regards to protect a world from the burdens of armaments and the scourge of war.

The Act was passed by the 87th Congress and signed by the President John F. Kennedy on September 26, 1961.

Provisions of the Act
The Arms Control and Disarmament Act established the Arms Control and Disarmament Agency (ACDA). The U.S. federal organization developed the formulation and implementation of the United States arms control and disarmament policy. The agency provided information and recommendations with regards to U.S. economic, foreign, and national security policies to executive and legislative officials of the United States government.

The Act established several core functions for the Arms Control and Disarmament Agency;
 Conduct, coordinate, and support the research of the formulation for the arms control and disarmament policy.
 Management and preparation of the United States participation in international negotiations for the arms control and disarmament peace process.
 Coordination and dissemination of United States public information concerning arms control and disarmament policy.
 Operation and preparation, as appropriate, for the United States participation in control systems of domestic and international arms control and disarmament activities.

Titles of the Act
The federal statute was penned as four titles created as Chapter 35 within Title 22 which defines the United States foreign policies for international relations and intercourse records.

Title I — Short Title, Purpose, and Definitions
22 U.S.C. § 2551 ~ Purpose of Act
22 U.S.C. § 2552 ~ Definitions of Act

Title II — Organization
22 U.S.C. § 2561 ~ Establishment of agency
22 U.S.C. § 2562 ~ Director
22 U.S.C. § 2563 ~ Deputy Director
22 U.S.C. § 2564 ~ Assistant Directors
22 U.S.C. § 2565 ~ Bureaus, Offices, and Divisions
22 U.S.C. § 2566 ~ General Advisory Committee

Title III — Functions
22 U.S.C. § 2571 ~ Research
22 U.S.C. § 2572 ~ Patents
22 U.S.C. § 2573 ~ Policy formulation
22 U.S.C. § 2574 ~ Negotiations and related functions
22 U.S.C. § 2575 ~ Coordination

Title IV — General Provisions
22 U.S.C. § 2581 ~ General authority
22 U.S.C. § 2582 ~ Foreign Service Reserve and staff officers
22 U.S.C. § 2583 ~ Contracts or expenditures
22 U.S.C. § 2584 ~ Conflict of interest and dual compensation laws
22 U.S.C. § 2585 ~ Security requirements
22 U.S.C. § 2586 ~ Comptroller General audit
22 U.S.C. § 2587 ~ Transfer of activities and facilities to agency
22 U.S.C. § 2588 ~ Use of funds
22 U.S.C. § 2589 ~ Appropriation
22 U.S.C. § 2590 ~ Report to Congress

Amendments to 1961 Act
Chronological timeline of authorizations for U.S. Congressional legislation related to United States arms control and disarmament provisions.

See also

References

External links
 
 
 
 
 
 
 

1961 in American law
Arms control
Military disbanding and disarmament
Nuclear history of the United States
Nuclear weapons infrastructure of the United States
87th United States Congress
1961 in the environment
1961 in the United States